The Karuma–Juba High Voltage Power Line is a planned high voltage electricity power line, connecting the high voltage  substation at Karuma, in Kiryandongo District, in the Western Region of  Uganda, to another high voltage substation at Juba, in Jubek State, in South Sudan.

Location
The 400kV power line, begins at the 400kV substation at Karuma Hydroelectric Power Station. The line travels in a north-westerly direction to Olwiyo, in Nwoya District, in the Northern Region of Uganda.

After crossing the international border into South Sudan, the line travels from Nimule, in Imatong State to Juba, the capital city of South Sudan, a distance of approximately

Overview
This power line is planned to transmit electricity from the 600 megawatts Karuma Hydroelectric Power Station in Uganda, to Juba in South Sudan. It is part of the regional power-sharing protocols of the Nile Equatorial Lakes Subsidiary Action Program and of the East African Community. Uganda plans to sell electricity to neighboring countries, including South Sudan after Karuma Hydroelectric Power Station and Isimba Hydroelectric Power Station become operational in 2019. The government of South Sudan has plans to extend the high-voltage power line to Juba.

Construction
The two governments are in discussions on how to fund the construction of the power line, using loans from the Japan International Cooperation Agency, with each country being responsible for the portion of the line in her territory.

See also
 Bujagali–Tororo–Lessos High Voltage Power Line
 Nkenda–Mpondwe–Beni High Voltage Power Line
 Masaka–Mutukula–Mwanza High Voltage Power Line

References

External links
Website of the Uganda Electricity Transmission Company Limited
Global Transmission Report: UETCL: Expanding grid network to meet future load s of 1 April 2013.

High-voltage transmission lines in Uganda
Energy infrastructure in Africa
Energy in Uganda
Energy in South Sudan
 High-voltage transmission lines in South Sudan
Proposed electric power transmission systems
Proposed electric power infrastructure in Uganda
Proposed electric power infrastructure in South Sudan